The Da Vinci Code is a play based on the 2003 mystery thriller novel of the same name by Dan Brown, adapted by Rachel Wagstaff and Duncan Abel.

Production
The tour was originally due to start in April 2021, however was postponed. On 1 October 2021, it was announced the play will star Nigel Harman as Robert Langdon, Danny John-Jules as Sir Leigh Teabing and Hannah Rose Caton as Sophie Neveu. The play had its world premiere at the Churchill Theatre, Bromley on 10 January 2022, before touring the United Kingdom. The production was directed by Luke Sheppard. The tour closed early, due to the current challenges of touring

Cast and characters

Reception
Arifa Akbar of The Guardian called it "a decent crack at staging the bestseller".

External links
Official website

References

Plays based on novels
The Da Vinci Code
British plays
Thriller plays
2022 plays